The blue ribbon is a symbol of high quality.

Blue ribbon or Blue Ribbon may refer to:

 Blue Ribbon (software house) a budget home computer software publisher of the 1980s
 Japan's Blue Ribbon Awards
 Blue Ribbon Barbecue, a chain of 2 restaurants and a catering service in the Boston suburbs
 Blue Ribbon Intermediate Holdings, owner of Pabst Brewing Company
 Blue Ribbon fishery, fisheries officially or informally designated as being of extremely high quality
 Blue Ribbon Merrie Melodies, a reissue of Warner Bros Merrie Melodies and Looney Tunes series; see List of Warner Bros. cartoons with Blue Ribbon reissues
Blue Ribbon Online Free Speech Campaign
 Blue Ribbon Pairs, also known as the Edgar Kaplan Blue Ribbon Pairs, a duplicate bridge event held by the American Contract Bridge League
 Blue-ribbon panel, a group of exceptional people appointed to study a given question
 Blue Ribbon Schools Program, a US government program to honor schools
 Blue Ribbon Sports, the original name of sports-shoe manufacturer, Nike, Inc.
 The emblem of the Order of the Garter
 Medals of Honor (Japan)
 List of awareness ribbons

See also
Blue Riband (disambiguation)
Blue Ribbon Award (disambiguation)
Cordon Bleu (disambiguation)